This is a list of villages in Majuli, a fluvial island in the Brahmaputra river located in the Indian state of Assam. The list has the names of villages and their code. 
 NO 1 Phutuki
 Natun pohardia
Param Chapori (150010006000600001)
Kakila Gaon (150010006000600002)
Jamuguri (150010006000600008)
Kashikata Natun Chapari (150010006000600009)
Salmari (150010006000600012)
Hutar (150010006000600023)
Garu Chapari (150010006000600026)
Chayani (150010006000600029)
Tenga Chapari (150010006000600030)
Shayang Missing (150010006000600031)
Shayang Chapari (150010006000600032)
Missing Chapari (150010006000600033)
Baghmora (150010006000600042)
Uzirati (150010006000600043)
Misa Mora (150010006000600045)
Chengeli Suti (150010006000600046)
Majar Chapari (150010006000600048)
Ari Chapari (150010006000600049)
Rowmora (150010006000600050)
Rowmora Letera (150010006000600051)
Kamalia Chapari (150010006000600052)
Pohumora Vekeli (150010006000600054)
Bebezia (150010006000600059)
Molual Kalita (150010006000600060)
Molual Koibarta Miri (150010006000600061)
Okhal Chuk (150010006000600062)
Molual Miri (150010006000600063)
Birali Para (150010006000600064)
Kalia Gaon (150010006000600069)
 Bhalukmora
 Dekasenchowa Gaon(150010006000600...)
 Thakurbari Gaon(150010006000600...)
 Dekasenchowa Balichapori Gaon(150010006000600...)
Gowal Gaon (150010006000600070)
Borduar Chapari (150010006000600071)
Molapindha Chilakola Miri (150010006000600072)
Balichapori (150010006000600073)
Chilakola Kaibarta (150010006000600074)
Alengi Gaon (150010006000600075)
Bora Chuk (150010006000600076)
Bengena Ati Purani Satra (150010006000600078)
Natun Kartick Chapari (150010006000600081)
kartick Chapari (150010006000600082)
Sarasawa Beel (150010006000600084)
Boralengi Satra (150010006000600085)
No.2 Borgoya (150010006000600087)
Barun Chitadar Chuk (150010006000600089)
Natun Bedang Chapari (150010006000600090)
Kaibarta Gaon (150010006000600091)
Garamur Satra (150010006000600092)
Katoni Gaon Na-Satra (150010006000600098)
Nam Katani (150010006000600099)
Daria Gaon (150010006000600101)
Garamur Phutuki (150010006000600102)
Garamur Jogi Pathar (150010006000600103)
Manika Pathar (150010006000600104)
Natun kalamua Chapari (150010006000600105)
Ujani Jokai Boa (150010006000600107)
Pakajara Miri (150010006000600108)
Bengena Kalia (150010006000600109)
Jogi Gaon (150010006000600110)
No.3 Mohkhuti (150010006000600111)
Kakatibari (150010006000600112)
No.1 Mohkhuti (150010006000600113)
No.2 Mohkhuti (150010006000600114)
Pohardia (150010006000600115)
Bhogpur Pathar (150010006000600119)
Bhogpur Satra (150010006000600120)
Bhogpur Miri (150010006000600121)
No.3 Bhuramara (150010006000600122)
No.2 Gualbari (150010006000600123)
Pakajara Village (150010006000600124)
Kalia Gaon1 (150010006000600126)
Jamud Chuk (150010006000600127)
Nagan Chuk (150010006000600128)
Ranga Chahi (150010006000600129)
Gualbari (150010006000600130)
Jorbeel (150010006000600131)
Gossai Bari (150010006000600132)
Pohumora (150010006000600133)
No.1 Bhuramora (150010006000600134)
No.2 Bhuramora (150010006000600135)
Bura Sensowa (150010006000600137)
Motia Bari (150010006000600138)
Sumoimari (150010006000600140)
Mekheli Gaon (150010006000600144)
Dhoua Challa (150010006000600146)
Sukansuti Pathar (150010006000600148)
No.2 Bornoloni (150010006000600149)
No.1 Bornoloni (150010006000600150)
Howli (150010006000600151)
Korki Chuk (150010006000600154)
Korki Chuk1 (150010006000600155)
Jengrai Chapari (150010006000600156)
Moghua Chuk (150010006000600157)
Jengrai Miri (150010006000600158)
Gobor Chuk (150010006000600159)
No.2 Borpomua (150010006000600160)
No.1 Borpomua (150010006000600161)
Bhew Chuk Kumar Bari (150010006000600162)
Bhew Chuk (150010006000600163)
No.1 Namani Cerpai (150010006000600165)
Polongani (150010006000600167)
Siram Chapari (150010006000600168)
No.2 Ujani Chapari (150010006000600169)
Borbeel Bebejia (150010006000600173)
Foot chang (150010006000600174)
Kuhiar Bari (150010006000600175)
Deuri Gaon Pam (150010006000600176)
Rangali Bahar (150010006000600177)
Deuri Gaon (150010006000600178)
Abhoi Puria (150010006000600179)
Bokajan Miri (150010006000600180)
Owguri Baghpam (150010006000600181)
Bagar Gaon (150010006000600182)
Gayan Gaon1 (150010006000600183)
Gayan Chuk (150010006000600184)
Mera Ghorh (150010006000600186)
Chama Guri (150010006000600190)
Dakhin Pat satra (150010006000600191)
Kohal Gaon (150010006000600192)
Goroi Mari (150010006000600193)
Atoi Chuk (150010006000600194)
Borboka Pathar (150010006000600195)
Kamjan Alengi (150010006000600198)
Sarala Pathar (150010006000600201)
Ratanpur Gavorumalia (150010006000600205)
Kathal Khowa (150010006000600207)
Kathal Khowa Pam (150010006000600208)
Tatibari (150010006000600209)
Mayangia (150010006000600210)
Panikhati (150010006000600211)
Kandhuli Mari (150010006000600212)
Chawrekia (150010006000600216)
No.2 Anichuk (150010006000600218)
Gejera (150010006000600219)
Kachari Gaon (150010006000600221)
Apechi Pathar (150010006000600222)
Baligaon (150010006000600223)
Ponia Gaon (150010006000600224)
Bonoria Chapari (150010006000600229)
Sikari Gaon (150010006000600231)
Jabar Chuk Katani (150010006000600237)
Jabar chuk (150010006000600238)
Dablee Chapari (150010006000600241)
Takar Chapari (150010006000600242)
Furfuria Chapari (150010006000600243)
Sesuguri Chapari (150010006000600244)
Kamalpur Gaon (15001006000600245)
Mohkina Gaon (15001006000600246)
Upperkatoni Gaon (15001006000600247)
Deodia ati Gaon (15001006000600248)
Kamar Gaon
Potia Gaon
Totoya Gaon
Rawana Gaon
Saringa Ati
Bihimpur Satra
 Hazarika Gaon
 Gopalpur Gaon
 Gereki Gaon
 Raidangoni
 See also
List of educational institutes in Majuli

References

Sources
Jorhat (Up to Apr-09)
 List of Majuli Villages

villages
Majuli villages
Majuli
Majuli